Medical Practice Consultants or Healthcare Management Consultants typically advise licensed healthcare providers and health-systems on business and administrative issues, but not clinical issues. 

These topics commonly include governance, operations, human resources, finance, billing, coding, transactions and marketing, but there are dozens of subcategories and specialties within the field. 

More and more hospitals engage them as physician practices are acquired and more physicians are employed.  There are several trade association in the US for healthcare business consultants, the largest by-far being the National Society of Certified Healthcare Business Consultants (NSCHBC) that also serves dental, podiatric, chiropractic, physical therapy, and other subspecialty practice management consultants. NSCHBC offers a credential in the field; Certified Healthcare Business Consultant or "CHBC"; a directory searchable by specialty and state; and continuing education programs. Consulting rates vary from under $100 per hour to over $400 per hour. 

Health care occupations